Turn It On! is an album by saxophonist Sonny Stitt recorded in 1971 and released on the Prestige label. The album features Stitt using the varitone, an electronic amplification device which altered the saxophone's sound.

Reception
Allmusic reviewed the album stating "Stitt uses an electrical device (a Varitone) on his tenor that waters down his tone a bit. With organist Leon Spencer, guitarist Melvin Sparks and drummer Idris Muhammad setting down unrelenting grooves on most of the five numbers (including the 11-minute title cut), Stitt only seems to be making cameo appearances".

Track listing 
All compositions by Leon Spencer except where noted
 "Turn It On" - 11:10     
 "The Bar-B-Que Man" - 7:59     
 "Miss Riverside" - 9:28     
 "Cry Me a River" (Arthur Hamilton) - 3:54     
 "There Are Such Things" (Stanley Adams, Abel Baer, George W. Meyer) - 4:01

Personnel 
Sonny Stitt - tenor saxophone, varitone
Virgil Jones - trumpet (tracks 1-3)
Leon Spencer Jr. - organ
Melvin Sparks - guitar 
Idris Muhammad - drums

References 

1971 albums
Prestige Records albums
Sonny Stitt albums
Albums recorded at Van Gelder Studio
Albums produced by Bob Porter (record producer)